The South African Railways Class 15B 4-8-2 of 1918 was a steam locomotive.

Between 1918 and 1922, the South African Railways placed thirty Class 15B steam locomotives with a 4-8-2 Mountain type wheel arrangement in service.

Manufacturer
The Class 15B was ordered at a time when further orders of the earlier Class 15 models were unobtainable from manufacturers in the United Kingdom as a result of wartime disruption in Europe. The first batch of ten Class 15B 4-8-2 steam locomotives for the South African Railways (SAR) was therefore ordered from the Montreal Locomotive Works (MLW) in Canada, who undertook to supply engines of equivalent power, wheelbase and weight to that of the Class 15A, but built to their own design. They were built and delivered in 1918, numbered in the range from 1829 to 1838. A second batch of twenty locomotives was ordered from the same builders and delivered in 1922, numbered in the range from 1971 to 1990.

Characteristics
Many of the parts of these engines were similar to those of the Class 14C which was built by the same manufacturers in that same year.

Modifications

Cylinder bushing
The first ten locomotives were modified on similar lines as the earlier versions of the Class 14C. As they went in for major overhauls, they had their cylinders bushed to reduce the bore from the as-built .

Watson Standard boilers

During the 1930s, many serving locomotives were reboilered with a standard boiler type designed by A.G. Watson, CME of the SAR at the time, as part of his standardisation policy. Such Watson Standard reboilered locomotives were reclassified by adding an "R" suffix to their classification.

Eventually all thirty Class 15B locomotives were reboilered with Watson Standard no. 2A boilers and reclassified to Class 15BR. The number plate of no. 1972, as illustrated, had the "B" omitted in error.

Only slight modifications were found necessary to accept the Watson Standard boilers. With the new boilers, the side running boards and platforms were attached to the engine frames instead of to the boilers as in the original design. These were the only two locomotive types where the height restriction had been exceeded by 1945.

Their original Belpaire boilers were fitted with Ramsbottom safety valves, while the Watson Standard boiler was fitted with Pop safety valves. Early conversions were equipped with copper and later conversions with steel fireboxes. In the process of reboilering they were also equipped with Watson cabs, with their distinctive slanted fronts compared to the conventional vertical fronts of their original cabs, to enable easier access to the firebox stays.

An obvious difference between an original and a Watson Standard reboilered locomotive is usually a rectangular regulator cover, just to the rear of the chimney on the reboilered locomotive. In the case of the Class 15B and Class 15BR, two even more obvious differences are the Watson cab and the absence of the Belpaire firebox hump between the cab and boiler on the reboilered locomotives.

Service

South African Railways
The Class 15B was placed in service in the eastern Orange Free State, but eventually spent most of their working lives in the Cape Midland, working south from Noupoort to Cradock and across to De Aar. When the Class 15F started taking over in that area, they were gradually relocated to Cape Town, from where they worked goods and passenger trains to the north. They also worked across Sir Lowry's Pass to Caledon and Bredasdorp in the Overberg and on the Bitterfontein line via Malmesbury and Klawer.

Some were shedded at Worcester and at Ashton for shunting. The usual way of exchanging the Ashton shunter every fortnight was for it to be used on the local passenger train which was normally hauled by a Garratt. They were withdrawn by 1976.

Caminhos de Ferro de Moçambique
In March and July 1973, twelve Class 15BR locomotives were sold in two batches to Caminhos de Ferro de Moçambique (CFM), the Mozambique Railways, which mainly used them for shunting at Lourenco Marques and occasionally on freight service to Swaziland. The SAR engine numbers of these locomotives were 1836, 1974, 1981, 1983, 1984 and 1986 sold in March 1973, and 1829, 1831, 1838, 1976, 1977 and 1985 sold in July 1973. The CFM renumbered the March batch to 421, 426 and 422 to 425, and the July batch to 427 to 432. This renumbering sequence could, however, not be ascertained with certainty.

Industrial
Six Class 15BR locomotives were sold into industrial use.
 Numbers 1972 and 1980 went to Tweefontein United Collieries.
 Numbers 1973, 1975, 1982 and 1990 went to the Randfontein Estates Gold Mine (REGM).

Preservation

Illustration
The main picture shows Class 15BR no. 1982 at Bonnievale on the Saturdays-only Worcester-Riversdale passenger train in February 1974. The following pictures show SAR no. 1838 as built, with a Belpaire firebox, and REGM no. R7, ex SAR Class 15BR no. 1990, with a Watson Standard boiler and round-top firebox, photographed on the Doornkop branch while heading a mine manager's tour of the REGM system on 14 September 1997.

References

1830
1830
4-8-2 locomotives
2D1 locomotives
MLW locomotives
Cape gauge railway locomotives
Railway locomotives introduced in 1918
1918 in South Africa
Scrapped locomotives